Craugastor gulosus is a species of frog in the family Craugastoridae.
It is found in Costa Rica and Panama.
Its natural habitat is subtropical or tropical moist montane forests.
It is threatened by habitat loss.

References

gulosus
Amphibians described in 1875
Amphibians of Costa Rica
Amphibians of Panama
Taxonomy articles created by Polbot